MLBPA Baseball, known in Japan as , is a baseball video game for the Super NES, Mega Drive/Genesis, and Game Gear.

Summary
The game included the 1993 season's major league players and stats thanks to its MLBPA license, but could not use team names for lack of an MLB license.  The game got around this by using the city names of each team with matching colors, and using terms "A League", "N League", and "The Series". Notably MLB teams representing a state are referred to by a city in that state instead, for instance, The Florida Marlins are referred to as Miami in the game. (Coincidentally, the team would later rename themselves the Miami Marlins in 2012.) Players are allowed to play a single game (with the default teams being Philadelphia at Toronto, the 1993 league champs), a full season based on the 1994 schedule (with wins and losses recorded by password in the SNES version, battery back-up for Genesis), playoffs, and a World Series.  Though the full season mode is based on the 1994 schedule, it does not include the new (and current) three divisions/wild card format introduced for the 1994 season; instead it uses the old two division (per league) format.

Couched in what the packaging billed as "huge arcade style graphics," games could be played on either natural or artificial grass (depending on the home team) during day or night. The game also featured scoreboard animations for double and triple plays, home runs, grand slams, pitching changes, pinch hitters, and sometimes strike outs.

The SNES version is the first ever baseball video game to include the Atlanta Braves' distinctive Tomahawk Chop theme song, which is advertised on the back of the game box.

The game's cover features Brent Gates of the Oakland Athletics and Billy Hatcher of the Boston Red Sox.

The Japanese version of Fighting Baseball did not have the MLBPA license and used modified player names and statistics.

Reception
On release, Famicom Tsūshin scored the Super Famicom version of the game a 20 out of 40. GamePro praised the easy controls, digitized voices, and the ability to control the ball after it leaves the pitcher's hand, but criticized the lack of real teams and the so-so graphics. They summarized it as an enjoyable game that falls short of ranking among the best in the genre.

The Japanese version of Fighting Baseball, which did not have the MLBPA license, achieved fame on the Internet in 2017 when the programmer-created rosters went viral.  The game's players include examples of Engrish and included names such as 'Sleve McDichael' and 'Bobson Dugnutt'.

References

External links

1994 video games
Coconuts Japan games
Game Gear games
High Score Productions games
Major League Baseball video games
Multiplayer and single-player video games
Sega Genesis games
Super Nintendo Entertainment System games
Video games developed in the United States
Video games scored by Brian L. Schmidt
Video games set in 1993